Antherophagus is a genus of silken fungus beetles in the family Cryptophagidae. There are at least four described species in Antherophagus.

ITIS Taxonomic note:
The genus name Antherophagus has been variously attributed to Dejean 1821:45 (e.g., Leschen 1996:587) or to Latreille 1829:507 (e.g., Bousquet 1989:12). Under the current International Code of Zoological Nomenclature, Dejean's use is now considered valid by indication with the type species being designated by Westwood, as cited by Leschen (pers. comm., Dr. Paul Skelley, January 2013).

Species
 Antherophagus convexulus LeConte, 1863
 Antherophagus ochraceus Melsheimer, 1844
 Antherophagus pallidivestis Casey, 1900
 Antherophagus suturalis Mäklin, 1853

References

Further reading

 
 
 
 

Cryptophagidae